Parimal Dhirajlal Nathwani (born 1 February 1956) is an Indian politician and industrialist. He is a Member of Parliament, Rajya Sabha from Andhra Pradesh. He has also served as a Rajya Sabha MP from Jharkhand from 2008-2020. He was elected to the Rajya Sabha, the upper house of the Parliament of India from Andhra Pradesh in the 2020 Rajya Sabha elections. His two earlier seats in the Parliament of India was from Jharkhand.

He was an entrepreneur before he joined the Reliance Group of Industries in 1997. Currently he is the Director, Corporate Affairs at the Reliance Industries Limited. He worked very closely with Late Shri Dhirubhai Ambani as well as Mukesh Ambani and played a pivotal role in land acquisition for the world's largest oil refinery in Jamnagar, Gujarat

Nathwani has spearheaded several projects of the Reliance Industries Limited, like land acquisition, setting up their retail outlets as well as roll out of Reliance Jio in Gujarat.  As a Member of Parliament from Jharkhand, he worked towards the betterment of the villages he adopted under the PMSAGY scheme.

Biography
Parimal D. Nathwani serves as Director of Corporate Affairs at Reliance Industries Ltd. Nathwani has also served as the Vice President of the Gujarat Cricket Association during 2010-2019. He serves as Director of Gujarat Petcoke and Petroproducts P. Ltd. and Shri Dwarkadheesh Salt Works Pvt. Ltd. He served as the chairman of the Board of Vadodara Stock Exchange Limited from 30 September 2011 to 15 September 2012 and its Director from February 2008 to 15 September 2012. In 1997, he joined Reliance Industries. He led several projects for the group from the grass-root level. Nathwani holds key positions in various prestigious institutions like Reliance Rural Development Trust (RRDT)- Chairman, Dwarkadheesh Devasthan Samiti (DOS)- Vice-chairman (appointed by Govt. of Gujarat), Nathdwara Temple Board- Member (appointed by Govt. of Rajasthan), National Safety Council, Gujarat Chapter- Ex-Chairman, and Organization of Business, Commerce and Industries (OBCI)- President. He also remained Director. Pavitra Yatradham Vikas Board was formed to improve and enhance facilities at all important Temples of Gujarat. He is an Executive Member of Lions Club of Jamnagar; Member of Rotary Club of Jamnagar, Jamnagar Chamber of Commerce and Industries and executive committee of Gujarat Chamber of Commerce and Industries.

Nathwani accolades include a coveted Award for Social Service from then Governor of Gujarat Shri R.K. Trivedi.

Early life
Born on 1 February 1956 to Pushpaben Nathwani and Dhirajlal Nathwani in Mumbai, Parimal Nathwani did his schooling from Gokalibai Punamchand Pitambar High School, Mumbai. He holds a PhD in management from the National Institute of Management, Ahmedabad. He holds a Professional Doctorate in Management from the National Institute of Management, Mumbai. He pursued his graduation from Mumbai.

After trying his luck in Mumbai, he moved to Vadodara and start working at the Vadodara Stock Exchange. He served as the Chairman of the Board of Vadodara Stock Exchange Limited from 30 September 2011 to 15 September 2012 and was Director from February 2008 to 15 September 2012.

Journey With Reliance 
Nathwani played a role in removing hurdles in land acquisition and facilitated the setting up of the refinery. Reliance bosses relocated Nathwani to Ahmedabad, and he gained more responsibilities in 1997. He led several projects of the group such as land acquisition for the Jamnagar refinery, setting up petroleum retail outlets and establishing Jamnagar Special Economic Zone. Nathwani became the face of Reliance Industries Limited (RIL) in Gujarat and elsewhere.

He contributed to cross country gas transportation pipeline network, executed a telecom network for the Reliance Infocomm and helped create a consumer retail chain for the group. Since the RIL is poised to roll out 4-G broadband network in 22 circles of the country, he is to lead the project. He remained in charge of the group's Corporate Affairs and industrial relations of the Group's establishments in Gujarat, Delhi and Madhya Pradesh. He is part of RIL's top management.

Political career
In March 2008, Nathwani entered the Rajya Sabha as an independent candidate from Jharkhand. He got re-elected as Rajya Sabha member from the tribal state in March 2014. After completing two terms as an MP from Jharkhand he is now elected as Member of Rajya Sabha from the state of Andhra Pradesh since April 2020. He joined YSR Congress Party on 11 March 2020 in the presence of Y. S. Jagan Mohan Reddy Chief Minister of Andhra Pradesh and President of YSR Congress Party.

Role as Gujarat Cricket Association Former Vice-President
Nathwani worked as the Vice President of Gujarat Cricket Association (GCA) from January 2010 to September 2019. GCA rebuilt the Motera stadium at Ahmedabad into the world’s largest stadium. The previously built Motera stadium was demolished. Nathwani worked closely with Union Home Minister Shri Amit Shah to complete project of building the world’s largest cricket stadium. Nathwani also provided umbrellas to cricketers of Gujarat like Parthiv Patel, Yusuf Pathan, Irfan Pathan, and Ravindra Jadeja. Nathwani has helped the sportsmen of Jharkhand by providing them incentives during 34th National Games at Ranchi, providing cricket equipment to local sports club, constructing stadiums in villages, etc.

Role as Dwarkadheesh Devasthan Samiti Ex-Vice Chairman
A setback in the stock market in the early 90s drew Nathwani to Krishna and Dwarkadheesh. Previously, he has served as Vice Chairman of Dwarkadheesh Devasthan Samiti. He is also a member of the Nathdwara Temple Board. He has been instrumental in development of Dwarka, an important destination for pilgrimage tourism. The Government of Gujarat and Reliance Industries have worked together for the development of Dwarka. Renovation of Gomatighat, Dhirubhai Ambani Marg, Dwarka Parisar development, Kokila Dhiraj Dham, traffic circle and a road, floral decoration and illumination of Dwarkadheesh temple during festivals like Janmashtami etc. have much of the credit to Nathwani and Reliance Industries. Sudama Setu, a cable-staid bridge to cross Gomati river is the latest addition in Dwarka. Plus, Nathwani worked on renovation of Gomatighat, Dhirubhai Ambani Marg, Dwarka Parisar development, Kokila Dhiraj Dham, and the illumination of the Dwarkadheesh temple during festivals like Janmashtami.

Positions held
 Member of Parliament (Rajya Sabha) from Andhra Pradesh
 Director - Corporate Affairs at the Reliance Industries Limited (RIL)
 Member - Parliamentary Standing Committee on Science and Technology,  Environment, Forests and Climate Change
 Member - Consultative Committee, Ministry of Home Affairs
 Former Chairman - Reliance Rural Development Trust (RRDT)
 Director Dwarkadheesh Salt Works Pvt. Ltd.
 Member - Gujarat Chamber of Commerce and Industries. 
 Former Group President - (Corporate Affairs and Projects), Reliance Industries Limited (RIL)
 Former Member - Standing Committee on Personnel, Public Grievances, Law & Justice
 Former Member - Standing Committee on Railways
 Former Member - Consultative Committee, Ministry of Civil Aviation
 Former Member - Select Committee on Payment & Settlement (Amendment) Bill
 Permanent Special Invitee - Consultative Committee, Ministry of External Affairs
 Former Member - Multi-sectoral Development Program Committee (MsDP), Jharkhand
 Former Member - Hindi Salahkar Samiti, Economic Affairs Division and Financial Services Division, Ministry of Finance
 Trustee in the Board of Governor's Social Welfare Fund (Gujarat)
 Former Vice President - Gujarat Cricket Association
 Ex-Vice Chairman - Dwarka Devasthan Samiti
 Member - Nathdwara Temple Board
 Former Chancellor - Shree Bruhad Gujarat Sanskrut Parishad
 Former Member - Gujarat Ayurved University Development Board
 Director - Gujarat Petcoke and Petro-products Supply Pvt. Ltd.
 Former President - Gujarat Industries Navratri Festival Society (GINFS)
 Ex-chairman - Vadodara Stock Exchange
 President - Gujarat State Football Association
 Chairman - Indian Institute of Public Health, Gandhinagar

Publications
GIR LION – THE PRIDE OF GUJARAT (APRIL 2013)

Bibliography

Books
ADORABLE & ADMIRABLE PARIMAL NATHWANI (27 MARCH 2021,AHMEDABAD)

References

External links 
Parliamentary profile at India.gov.in
Official Website

Living people
1956 births
Politicians from Mumbai
Rajya Sabha members from Jharkhand
Indian industrialists
Independent politicians in India
YSR Congress Party politicians
Writers from Gujarat
Indian football executives